Prof. Dr. Shaharuddin Badaruddin (19 September 1962 – 2 August 2018) was a Malaysian politician.

Shaharuddin was the vice president of the People's Justice Party (PKR), a component party in the Pakatan Harapan (PH) ruling coalition. Shaharuddin was elected to represent Seri Setia constituency in the Selangor State Legislative Assembly in 2018 general election. He defeated three other candidates on 9 May 2018 and was appointed as the state executive councillor on 14 May 2018. Shaharuddin was the chairman of the Selangor Islamic Affairs, Education and Human Capital Development Committee.

Election results

Death
Badaruddin died of stage four colon cancer on 2 August 2018 at 6.28 pm at the Putrajaya Hospital at age 55. Shaharuddin's remains was brought to his residence at Desa Pinggiran Putra, Kajang before brought to the Jamiurrahmah Mosque at Kampung Limau Manis, Sungai Merab for prayers and then burial at Kampung Limau Manis Cemetery the next day.

Badaruddin's death had let to the vacancy of Seri Setia state constituency which set for the 2018 Seri Setia by-election on the 8 September 2018 that saw PH candidate Halimey Abu Bakar from the PKR defeated Pan-Malaysian Islamic Party (PAS) candidate Halimah Ali to retain the seat.

References

1962 births
2018 deaths
Deaths from colorectal cancer
Deaths from cancer in Malaysia
People from Selangor
Malaysian people of Malay descent
Malaysian Muslims
People's Justice Party (Malaysia) politicians
Members of the Selangor State Legislative Assembly
Selangor state executive councillors
21st-century Malaysian politicians